Warminghurst is a tiny village in the Horsham District of West Sussex, England. It lies on the Ashington to Heath Common road 2.4 miles (3.9 km) northeast of Storrington.

The Church of the Holy Sepulchre, Warminghurst's Anglican church, was declared redundant in 1979.  The Grade I-listed 13th-century building is now cared for by the Churches Conservation Trust.

In 1676 Henry Bigland sold Warminghurst Manor to William Penn. Using this house, the Penn family were able to hold secret monthly meetings for Quakers from the local Horsham district and when Penn left England in 1682 for his first visit to America, he had many of these local Quakers join him. In 1707 he sold the house to James Butler who had it demolished and then erected another on the site, which was then subsequently demolished by the Duke of Norfolk in 1806. The large barn and farm buildings which survive today behind Park Lane likely do not date from Penn's house but from the early 18th century mansion of James Butler.

References

External links

Horsham District
Villages in West Sussex